This is a list of professional wrestling promotions in Australia and lists both notable active and defunct promotions.

List of promotions

Active

Nationwide

New South Wales

Queensland

South Australia

Victoria

Western Australia

Defunct (Notable)

See also

Professional wrestling in Australia
List of professional wrestling promotions

References

 
Australia sport-related lists
Australia